Allot is a surname. Notable people with the surname include:

 Robert Allot (died 1635), London bookseller and publisher
 William Allot (16th century), English Roman Catholic priest
 John Allot (died 1591), 16th-century English merchant and politician
 Well Emmanuel Allot (1919–2012), birth name of François Brigneau 
 William Dixon Allott (1817–1892)